Thomas Kirkpatrick may refer to:
Thomas Kirkpatrick (Canadian politician) (1805–1870), Canadian lawyer and politician
Thomas Kirkpatrick (New York politician), American politician from New York
Thomas J. Kirkpatrick (1829–1897), Virginia lawyer, Confederate officer and politician
Percy Kirkpatrick (Thomas Percy Claude Kirkpatrick, 1869–1954), Irish physician, historian and writer
Sir Thomas Kirkpatrick, 1st Baronet (died c. 1695) of the Kirkpatrick baronets
Sir Thomas Kirkpatrick, 2nd Baronet (died c. 1730) of the Kirkpatrick baronets
Sir Thomas Kirkpatrick, 3rd Baronet (1704–1771) of the Kirkpatrick baronets
Sir Thomas Kirkpatrick, 5th Baronet (1777–1844) of the Kirkpatrick baronets
Sir Thomas Kirkpatrick, 7th Baronet (1839–1880) of the Kirkpatrick baronets

See also
Kirkpatrick (disambiguation)
Clan Kirkpatrick